The KY postcode area, also known as the Kirkcaldy postcode area, is a group of sixteen postcode districts in eastern Scotland, within thirteen post towns. These cover most of Fife (including Kirkcaldy, Dunfermline, Glenrothes, St Andrews, Anstruther, Burntisland, Cowdenbeath, Cupar, Inverkeithing, Kelty, Leven and Lochgelly), plus the far south of Perth and Kinross (including Kinross itself).



Coverage
The approximate coverage of the postcode districts:

|-
! KY1
| KIRKCALDY
| Kirkcaldy (east), Dysart, Thornton, Wemyss
| Fife
|-
! KY2
| KIRKCALDY
| Kirkcaldy (west), Auchtertool
| Fife
|-
! KY3
| BURNTISLAND
| Burntisland, Kinghorn, Aberdour
| Fife
|-
! rowspan="2"|KY4
| COWDENBEATH
| Cowdenbeath, Hill of Beath, Crossgates
| rowspan="2"|Fife
|-
| KELTY
| Kelty
|-
! KY5
| LOCHGELLY
| Lochgelly, Cardenden, Ballingry, Kinglassie
| Fife
|-
! KY6
| GLENROTHES
| Glenrothes (west), Leslie, Kinnesswood
| Fife, Perth and Kinross
|-
! KY7
| GLENROTHES
| Glenrothes (centre and east), Markinch, Star
| Fife
|-
! KY8
| LEVEN
| Leven, Buckhaven, Methil, Methilhill, Largo, Windygates, Kennoway
| Fife
|-
! KY9
| LEVEN
| Earlsferry, Elie, Kilconquhar, Largoward
| Fife
|-
! KY10
| ANSTRUTHER
| Anstruther, Cellardyke, Kilrenny, Pittenweem, St Monans, Crail, Arncroach
| Fife
|-
! rowspan="2"|KY11
| DUNFERMLINE
| Dunfermline (south and east), Rosyth, Dalgety Bay, Limekilns, Charlestown
| rowspan="2"|Fife
|-
| INVERKEITHING
| Inverkeithing, North Queensferry
|-
! KY12
| DUNFERMLINE
| Dunfermline (centre, north and west), Rumbling Bridge, Powmill, Kincardine, Culross
| Fife
|-
! KY13
| KINROSS
| Kinross, Milnathort, Balado, Scotlandwell
| Perth and Kinross
|-
! KY14
| CUPAR
| Newburgh, Glenfarg, Gateside
| Fife, Perth and Kinross
|-
! KY15
| CUPAR
| Cupar, Ceres, Kilmany, Strathmiglo, Falkland, Ladybank, Freuchie
| Fife
|-
! KY16
| ST. ANDREWS
| St Andrews, Kingsbarns, Dunino, Guardbridge, St. Michaels, Balmullo
| Fife
|-
! style="background:#FFFFFF;"|KY99
| style="background:#FFFFFF;"|DUNFERMLINE
| style="background:#FFFFFF;"|VISA Special Postcode
| style="background:#FFFFFF;"|non-geographic
|}

Map

See also
Postcode Address File
List of postcode areas in the United Kingdom

References

External links
Royal Mail's Postcode Address File
A quick introduction to Royal Mail's Postcode Address File (PAF)

Postcode areas covering Scotland